The Fresno State Bulldogs men's basketball team represents California State University, Fresno, located in Fresno, California, in NCAA Division I basketball competition. They play their home games at the Save Mart Center and since 2012–13 are members of the Mountain West Conference. Their current head coach is Justin Hutson. They were members of the Western Athletic Conference from 1992 to 2012.

Postseason results

NCAA tournament results
The Bulldogs have appeared in six* NCAA Tournaments, with a combined record of 2–5.

*The appearance in 2000 was vacated due to the use of an ineligible player.

National Invitation Tournament results
The Bulldogs have appeared in ten National Invitation Tournaments, with a combined record of 14–10; they were champions in 1983.

College Basketball Invitational results
The Bulldogs have appeared in one College Basketball Invitational, with a record of 4–2.

The Basketball Classic results
The Bulldogs have appeared in The Basketball Classic one time. Their record is 4–0, and they won the Championship in 2022.

Regular season conference championships
Pacific Coast Athletic Association (2)
1981, 1982

Western Athletic Conference (3)
1996, 2001, 2003

Conference tournament championships
Pacific Coast Athletic Association tournament (3)
1981, 1982, 1984

Western Athletic Conference tournament (1)
2000 (vacated)

Mountain West Conference tournament (1)
2016

Honors and awards

Retired numbers

Notes

Notable former players

Courtney Alexander
Rafer Alston
Desi Barmore (born 1960), American-Israeli basketball player
Melvin Ely
Paul George (born 1990), basketball player
Nate Grimes (born 1996), basketball player in the Israeli Basketball Premier League
Chris Herren 
Tyler Johnson (born 1992), basketball player
Tito Maddox (born 1981)
Rod Higgins
Bernard Thompson
Ron Anderson
Mitch Arnold
Jervis Cole
Art Williams

References

External links